Jabir Bin Merdaw Al-Kaabi (1780–1881) was the Sheikh of Mohammerah during the 19th century.

The reign of Jabir Ibn Merdaw 
Sheikh Jabir was troubled by intertribal wars. He therefore confined himself to an attitude of neutrality while maintaining good relations with both the Persian and Ottoman governments, and notably with the Walis of Baghdad.

The tribe which was most troubling for Jabir was the Rabi'ah. He thus turned to an ancient Arabian diplomatic practice: he married Noura, the daughter of the Sheikh of the Rabi'ah, Talal, in order to appease the opposition of that tribe. One son was born from this union, to become the last ruler of autonomous Arabistan.

The constant conflict between the Ottomans and the Qajars, the weakening of these empires, as well as the intelligent diplomacy of Sheikh Jabir would result in the Persian emperor, Naser al-Din Shah Qajar, recognising Arabistan as the dominion of Sheikh Jabir and his successors. The Shah agreed to not interfere in the internal affairs of the emirate.

Death 
Jabir died on 2 November 1881 and was succeeded by his second son Miz'al Khan ibn Haji Jabir Khan.

References

Iranian governors
Iranian Arab politicians
19th-century Arabs
1780s births
1881 deaths
People from Khuzestan Province